Paraloricaria vetula is a species of armored catfish found in the La Plata Basin of Argentina, Brazil and Uruguay.  This species grows to a length of  TL.

References
 

Loricariini
Fish of South America
Fish of Argentina
Fish of Brazil
Fish of Uruguay
Taxa named by Achille Valenciennes
Fish described in 1835